Héctor Valenzuela (born 18 March 1973) is a Colombian former professional racing cyclist. He won the Colombian National Road Race Championships in 2000.

References

External links
 

1973 births
Living people
Colombian male cyclists
Place of birth missing (living people)